The Berindești is a left tributary of the river Argeș in Romania. It flows into the Argeș in Poienari.

References

Rivers of Romania
Rivers of Argeș County